Carapus is a genus of pearlfishes, with these currently recognized species:

The Carapus (or pearlfish) belongs to the Carapidae family and are described as eel-like fishes. This particular organism is considered parasitic due to the fact that it lives inside different invertebrates. These invertebrates include holothurians, sea stars, and bivalves. The Carapus live in connection with several species of sea cucumbers and starfish.

 Carapus acus (Brünnich, 1768) (pearlfish)
 Carapus bermudensis (J. M. Jones, 1874) (Atlantic pearlfish)
 Carapus dubius (Putnam, 1874) (Pacific pearlfish)
 Carapus mourlani (Petit, 1934) (star pearlfish)
 Carapus sluiteri (M. C. W. Weber, 1905)

References

Carapidae
Taxa named by Constantine Samuel Rafinesque